McAndrew is a surname reflecting Scottish ancestry, people with the Surname include the following:
British photographer Chris McAndrew
British journalist  Daisy McAndrew
British playwright and actor Deborah McAndrew (born 1967)
American psychologist Francis T. McAndrew
American general James W. McAndrew (1862-1922)
American baseball player Jamie McAndrew
Canadian  Jim McAndrew (athlete)
American  baseball player Jim McAndrew
New Zealand rally driver Joe McAndrew
Mayo Gaelic footballer John McAndrew
Canadian politician John Alfred McAndrew
American singer Matt McAndrew
Australian cricketer Nathan McAndrew
English model Nell McAndrew
Scottish footballer Tony McAndrew
American sports coach William McAndrew
American educator William McAndrew
Guyanese folklorist poet Wordsworth McAndrew
 Wordsworth McAndrew Award

See also
MacAndrew
McAndrew Stadium of Southern Illinois University
"McAndrew's Hymn", an 1894 poem by Rudyard Kipling
McAndrews (disambiguation)

Patronymic surnames
Surnames from given names